Cart is a 2014 South Korean film directed by Boo Ji-young about employees of a retail supermarket who band together when the contract workers are laid off, it is both an ensemble drama and a social critique.

It made its world premiere in the City to City: Seoul sidebar of the 2014 Toronto International Film Festival. Cart will also screen at the 19th Busan International Film Festival and the 34th Hawaii International Film Festival.

Plot
Sun-hee, a veteran cashier and mother of two, works at a large retail supermarket alongside Hye-mi, a single mother. Both are friendly with Soon-rye, a cleaning lady nearing retirement age, and all of them are temporary workers. Sun-hee is a model employee who works diligently in the belief that once she gets promoted as a regular worker, she'll be able to provide more for her children. However, their corporate employer abruptly notifies them that all the temporary workers will be laid off. Faced with these wrongful dismissals, Sun-hee, Hye-mi, Soon-rye, and fellow female employees such as naive ajumma Ok-soon and twenty-something Mi-jin, resolve to go on strike. They stage a series of increasingly impassioned protests against the company's exploitative practices, which gains more strength when junior manager Dong-joon, the only male representative of the store's labor union, joins in. The shy and passive Sun-hee, who finds herself thrust to the demonstrations' front lines, discovers within herself untapped resources of determination and resilience, which has an unexpected effect on her relationship with her estranged high school-age son, Tae-young. But as the women realize the power they can wield by taking a mutual stand, the company plays the workers against each other and Hye-mi, the leader of the strike, caves to the company's pressure and gives up.

Cast

 Yum Jung-ah as Sun-hee
 Moon Jung-hee as Hye-mi
 Kim Young-ae as Madam Soon-rye
 Kim Kang-woo as Dong-joon
 Doh Kyung-soo as Tae-young
 Hwang Jeong-min  as Ok-soon
 Chun Woo-hee as Mi-jin
 Lee Seung-joon as Section chief Choi
 Ji Woo as Soo-kyung
 Park Soo-young as Manager
 Song Ji-in as Ye-rin
 Hwang Jae-won as Min-soo
 Kim Soo-an as Min-young
 Lee Seon-hee as Cashier
 Kim Hyun as Cashier
 Kim Hee-won as Convenience store boss (cameo)
 Gil Hae-yeon as Real customer (cameo)

Background
The film is largely inspired by a 2007 incident in which Homever, a supermarket chain owned by E-Land Group, dismissed temporary workers, mostly women, and replaced them with outsourced employees to bypass a new law requiring that employees be given regular-worker status after a certain period. Dismissed employees and labor unions went on strike in front of the supermarket for 512 days until the matter was settled, with some employees reinstated. Director Boo Ji-young also studied the plight of irregular cleaning staff at major universities in Korea, including Hongik and Yonsei.

Awards and nominations

References

External links 
  
 
 
 

2014 films
2010s Korean-language films
South Korean drama films
Myung Films films
Films about the labor movement
2010s South Korean films